Pedro Arce may refer to:

 Pedro Miguel Arce (born 1961), Nicaraguan actor
 Pedro Arce (Mexican footballer) (born 1991), Mexican football attacking midfielder
 Pedro Arce (Paraguayan footballer) (born 1991), Paraguayan football midfielder